The 2014 Unibet Masters was the second staging of the non-ranking Masters darts tournament, held by the Professional Darts Corporation (PDC). It was held between 1–2 November 2014 at the Royal Highland Centre in Edinburgh, Scotland.

Phil Taylor was the defending champion, having beaten Adrian Lewis 10–1 in the inaugural tournament's final. James Wade beat Taylor 11–9 in the semi-finals. Wade got off to a slow start in the final against Mervyn King, and trailed 0–5, 1–6, 2–9 and 6–10. However, Wade won the last 5 legs to triumph 11–10, and win his first major title since the 2011 UK Open.

The match distance changed this year with the first round and quarter-finals best of 19 legs.  The semi-finals and final also increased in distance to best of 21 legs.

Qualifiers
Only the top 16 players on the PDC's Order of Merit on 19 October 2014 qualified for the event. These were:

  Michael van Gerwen (semi-finals)
  Phil Taylor (semi-finals)
  Adrian Lewis (quarter-finals)
  Peter Wright (first round)
  Simon Whitlock (first round)
  James Wade (winner)
  Gary Anderson (quarter-finals)
  Dave Chisnall (quarter-finals)
  Robert Thornton (first round)
  Andy Hamilton (first round)
  Brendan Dolan (first round)
  Mervyn King (runner-up)
  Justin Pipe (quarter-finals)
  Kim Huybrechts (first round)
  Wes Newton (first round)
  Raymond van Barneveld (first round)

Prize money
The total prize fund was £160,000.

Draw
The draw was made on 20 October 2014.

Broadcasting
The tournament was available in the following countries on these channels:

References

Masters
Masters (darts)
Masters (darts)
November 2014 sports events in the United Kingdom
International sports competitions in Edinburgh
2010s in Edinburgh